Right Place, Wrong Time is a 2008 action-comedy film directed by Michael Allen Carter and starring Noah J. Smith.

Plot
Mitchell Williams (Smith) is not your everyday typical business owner. His over-the-edge attitude and no-nonsense demeanor force everyone around him out of his life. This leaves Mitchell with nothing, or so he thinks. As he tries to piece his life back together he soon realizes that he is being hunted by two men working for the mob. As if this isn't bad enough Mitchell's girlfriend Jamaica (Nikki Love) gives him his final ultimatum. Mitchell has only moments to save his life, his business, and the woman he loves and time is running out.

Cast
 Noah J. Smith as Mitchell Williams
 Albert Stroth as Gus
 Aubrey Caldwell as Shelly
 Barbara Swanson as Mrs. Williams
 Lisa Peirson-Burns as Tracy
 Michael Allen Carter as Tye
 Michael Teh as Alex
 Nicole Danielle as Lady
 Nikki Love as Jamaica
 Tamika Wheeler as Jazziana

External links
 

2008 films
African-American films
2000s action comedy-drama films
American action comedy-drama films
2000s English-language films
2000s American films